Marie Ann Shipley (April 8, 1899 – March 22, 1981) was a Canadian politician.

Born in Lawrence Station in Southwold, Ontario, she moved to Ottawa when she was 12, attended country school, Osgood Public School. She was then educated at Ottawa's Lisgar Collegiate and married Dr. Manley Adair Shipley.

Shipley and her husband, Dr. Manley Shipley, settled in Kirkland Lake in 1928 where she was an administrative secretary for the Kirkland District Mines Medical Plans. For two years, she was an administrator of the public school board. As a result of contradictory sources, the year of Dr.Shipley's death is not definitive but occurred between 1940 and 1942.

From 1943 to 1952, she was reeve of Teck Township. Shipley was president of the Association of Municipalities of Ontario, in 1951.

After Shipley's term in 1952, she left her position in municipal politics.  Shipley was a member within multiple organizations such as the Children's Aid Society, the Victorian Order of Nurses, the Hospital Board and the Red Cross Society, the Royal Canadian Legion, the Association of Canadian Travellers, the Girl Guides and the Business and Professional Women's Club. She was Protestant, and a member of the Young Women's Christian Association.

From 1953 to 1957, she was the Liberal Party Member of Parliament from the northeastern Ontario riding of Timiskaming in the House of Commons of Canada.

In 1955, she became the first woman to move acceptance in the House of Commons of a Speech from the Throne. On January 28, 1953, the Township of Teck hosted a testimonial dinner in honour of Shipley's ongoing presence in the several organizations she has helped. The dinner consisted of "Approximately 200 citizens of the town [...] representing some 85 organizations" there to support and recognize her contributions to the community. She was also the administrator of the Canadian Federation of Municipalities and Mayors.

References

External links
 

1899 births
1981 deaths
Members of the House of Commons of Canada from Ontario
Liberal Party of Canada MPs
People from Elgin County
Women members of the House of Commons of Canada
Mayors of places in Ontario
Women mayors of places in Ontario
People from Kirkland Lake
20th-century Canadian women politicians
Lisgar Collegiate Institute alumni